Barachois Pond Provincial Park is a large and popular Provincial Park in the southwest of the island of Newfoundland. The park is off the Trans-Canada Highway, near Stephenville.

There is a hiking path to the top of Erin Mountain, a peak in the Long Range Mountains, which run along the west coast of Newfoundland.  This trail takes about 2 hours and goes by many streams and wildlife.

Barachois Pond is a large lake located in the park.

Chipmunks were first introduced into Newfoundland here.

See also
Barachois
List of Newfoundland and Labrador parks
List of Canadian provincial parks
List of National Parks of Canada

External links
 Park web site

Provincial parks of Newfoundland and Labrador